The 1995 Eastern Illinois Panthers football team represented Eastern Illinois University as a member of the Gateway Football Conference during the 1995 NCAA Division I-AA football season. Led by ninth-year head coach Bob Spoo, the Panthers compiled and overall record of 10–2 with a mark of 5–1 in conference play, winning the Gateway title.

Schedule

References

Eastern Illinois
Eastern Illinois Panthers football seasons
Eastern Illinois Panthers football